"Happy Death Day" is the debut single by the South Korean rock band Xdinary Heroes. The song was released by Studio J and JYP Entertainment on December 6, 2021.

Background and release 
On November 1, 2021, JYP Entertainment released a teaser titled "Heroes Are Coming" hinting at a new group to debut. A week later, on November 8, the logo and name of the group were revealed and the group's official social media accounts were launched. Jooyeon was officially announced as the group's first member, followed by O.de, Gaon, Jun Han, Jungsu, and Gunil from November 15–20. On November 22–27, teasers were released revealing the positions of the members. On December 5, a teaser for the music video were released by JYP. The single alongside its music video were released the next day.

Composition 
"Happy Death Day" is written and composed by the band's members Jungsu and Gaon, alongside with Shim Eun-ji, and Lee Hae-sol. Shim and Lee handled the arrangement of the song. According to the Gunil, the lyrics is about "the irony of encountering the harsh truth on the happiest and most celebrated day of the year, a person's birthday."

Promotion 
The band held a debut showcase to officially commence the promotions of the single. The single was also performed by the band in three music programs: KBS's Music Bank, MBC's Show! Music Core, and SBS's Inkigayo.

Commercial performance 
"Happy Death Day" debuted at number 12 on the Billboard World Digital Song Sales chart.

Track listing
 Digital download / streaming
 "Happy Death Day" – 3:40
 "Happy Death Day" (instrumental) – 3:40

Credits and personnel 
Credits adopted from Melon.

Studios
 JYPE Studios — digital editing, recording, mixing
 Quincy Jones — recording
 Lead Sound Studio — recording
 Honey Butter Studio — mastering

Personnel

 Gunil — drums, background vocals
 Jungsu — lyricist, composition, keyboard, vocals, background vocals 
 Gaon — lyricist, composition, electric guitar, vocals, rap, background vocals
 O.de — keyboard, vocals, rap, background vocals
 Jun Han — electric guitar, vocals, background vocals
 Jooyeon — bass, vocals, background vocals
 Lee Hae-sol — lyricist, composition, arrangement, electric guitar, sessions computer programming, recording
 Shim Eun-ji — lyricist, composition, arrangement, keyboard, vocal directing
 Lee Sang-yeop — recording
 Eom Chan-yong — recording
 Lee Tae-sub — mixing
 Park Jeong-eon — mastering

Charts

Release history

References

2021 debut singles
2021 songs
Korean-language songs
JYP Entertainment singles
South Korean rock songs